The Saint Lucia women's national football team is the national women's football team of Saint Lucia and is overseen by the Saint Lucia Football Association.

Results and fixtures

The following is a list of match results in the last 12 months, as well as any future matches that have been scheduled.

Legend

Coaching staff

Manager history
 Sean Kirton (20??–20??)
 Emmanuel Bellas (2021–)

Team

Current squad
The following players were selected to compete in the Caribbean Qualifiers for the CONCACAF 2020 Olympic Qualification Tournament.
Match dates: 30 September – 8 October 2019

Competitive record

FIFA Women's World Cup

*Draws include knockout matches decided on penalty kicks.

Olympic Games

CONCACAF W Championship

*Draws include knockout matches decided on penalty kicks.

See also
Sport in Saint Lucia
Football in Saint Lucia
Women's football in Saint Lucia
Saint Lucia men's national football team

References

External links
Official website
FIFA profile

Caribbean women's national association football teams
women